ENS El Moez (981) is the third ship of Egyptian Gowind-class corvette of the Egyptian Navy.

Development and design 

In 2014, Egypt signed a €1bn contract with Naval Group to buy four Gowind 2,500-ton corvettes with an option for two more. Separately, MBDA negotiated a contract to equip the ships with MICA vertical launch air-defense missiles and MM40 Block 3 Exocet anti-ship missiles, together worth an additional 400 million euros, while Naval Group negotiated a 100–200 million euro contract for torpedoes. Three of the corvettes are to be built locally by Alexandria Shipyardwithin a technology transfer agreement. It was apparently President Abdel Fattah el-Sisi who decided these were the ships he wanted rather than the Meko A200 being offered by German group ThyssenKrupp Marine Systems (TKMS) or the Sigma corvette proposed by Damen of the Netherlands. Egypt is in talks with France to acquire another two Gowind corvettes which, if ordered, would be produced by France in Lorient.

In April 2015, Naval Group started cutting metal for the very first Gowind 2500 corvette, with a planned construction period of 29 months. It is the first of a series of four units that will be delivered to Egypt before 2019. The corvette's first block was laid in the dry dock in September 2015. Naval Group celebrated the launch of the first Egyptian Gowind corvette El Fateh at the Lorient naval shipyard in September 2016. El Fateh successfully concluded its first sea trials by the end of March 2017. The Egyptian Navy took delivery of the vessel in September 2017, three years after the order was placed.

Construction and career 
El Moez was laid down in July 2018 and launched on 12 May 2019 by Alexandria Shipyard in Alexandria.

References 

2019 ships
Ships built in Egypt